Kronstadt is a Russian port city in Kronshtadtsky District of the federal city of Saint Petersburg, located on Kotlin Island,  west of Saint Petersburg, near the head of the Gulf of Finland. It is linked to the former Russian capital by a combination levee-causeway-seagate, the St Petersburg Dam, part of the city's flood defences, which also acts as road access to Kotlin island from the mainland.

Founded in the early 18th century by Peter the Great, it became an important international centre of commerce whose trade role was later eclipsed by its strategic significance as the primary maritime defence outpost of the former Russian capital. The main base of the Russian Baltic Fleet was located in Kronstadt, guarding the approaches to Saint Petersburg. In March 1921, the island city was the site of the Kronstadt rebellion.

The historic centre of the city and its fortifications are part of the World Heritage Site that is Saint Petersburg and Related Groups of Monuments.

Kronstadt has been a place of pilgrimage for Orthodox Christians for many years due to the memory of Saint John of Kronstadt.

Name
The name of the city is alternatively spelled as Kronshtadt, Cronstadt or Kronštadt. It is derived from German Kronstadt.

History

Foundation

Kronstadt was founded by Peter the Great, whose Imperial Russian forces took the island of Kotlin from the Swedes during the Great Northern War in 1703. During the winter, the Gulf of Finland freezes over completely. Under the command of Governor-general Alexander Danilovich Menshikov, workers used thousands of frames (caissons) made of logs from evergreen trees filled with stones which were moved by horses across the frozen sea, and placed in cuttings made in the ice. Thus, several new small islands were created, and forts were erected on them, virtually closing access to Saint-Petersburg by sea. Only two narrow navigable channels remained, with forts guarding them.

One of the first governors of Kronstadt was a veteran of the Royal Scots Navy, Admiral Thomas Gordon who was a refugee in Russia from the Scottish union with England and became chief commander of the port of Kronstadt from 1727 to 1741.

Just as Kronstadt became populated and fortified, it attracted merchants from maritime powers most notably, the Dutch, the British and the Germans through the old Hanse connections. The community of British merchants or "factors" came to be known as the English Factory, despite the fact that many of them were Scots. They settled both in Kronstadt and in St Petersburg itself and for a time dominated both inward and outward trade, especially in the reign of Catherine the Great. They became an integral part of British trade and foreign policy through the Board of Trade in London. A number of the British settlers became naturalised Russians. Trading alliances were sharply interrupted by the outbreak of the Crimean War (1854).

Kronstadt was thoroughly refortified in the 19th century. The old three-decker forts, five in number, which formerly constituted the principal defences and had resisted the Anglo-French fleets during the Crimean War, became of secondary importance. From the plans of Eduard Totleben a new fort, Fort Constantine, and four batteries were constructed (1856–1871) to defend the principal approach, and seven batteries to cover the shallower northern channel. All these fortifications were low and thickly armoured earthworks with heavy Krupp guns on their ramparts. The city is surrounded by an enceinte.

In summer 1891, the French fleet was officially received in Kronstadt. It was a first step towards the forthcoming Franco-Russian Alliance.

Russian Civil War
During the Petrograd (now Saint Petersburg) riots of the February revolution, the sailors of Petrograd joined the revolution and executed their officers, thus gaining a reputation as dedicated revolutionaries. During the civil war, the sailors participated on the red side, until 1921, when they rebelled against Bolshevik rule in the Kronstadt rebellion.

Kronstadt with its supporting forts and minefields was key in protecting Petrograd from foreign forces. Despite this, the cruiser Oleg was torpedoed and sunk by a small motor boat after participating in the bombardment of Krasnaya Gorka fort that had revolted against the Bolsheviks.

Kronstadt Rebellion

In 1921, a group of naval officers and men, together with soldiers and civilian supporters, rebelled against the Bolshevik government in Soviet Kronstadt. The garrison had previously been a centre of major support for the Bolsheviks, and throughout the Civil War of 1917–1921, the naval forces at Kronstadt had been at the vanguard of the main Bolshevik attacks. Their demands included freedom of speech, the end of deportation to work camps, a change in Soviet war politics, and liberation of the soviets (workers' councils) from "party control". After brief negotiations, Leon Trotsky (then the Minister of War in the Soviet Government, and the leader of the Red Army) responded by sending the army to Kronstadt, along with the Cheka. The uprising was thus suppressed following a massacre.

Interwar and World War II
In the late 1930s, the fortified city became the base of the Soviet Baltic Fleet. During that time it was an important training centre for the Soviet navy. The Kronstadt naval dockyard overhauled and repaired surface ships and submarines for the Baltic Fleet. All forts and batteries of the city were reconstructed.

At 23:37 on June 21, 1941, fleet operational readiness Number 1 was announced by Baltic Fleet Commander Vice Admiral V. Tributs on the order of the People's Commissar of the Navy Admiral N.G. Kuznetsov. Several hours later the first German aircraft began dropping mines into the canal outside Kronstadt. The duty officer, first lieutenant S. Kushnerev, ordered anti-aircraft batteries to open fire on enemy planes. Several aircraft were shot down or damaged. Twenty-seven German planes took part in the first attack, and three were destroyed by the anti-aircraft guns of the 1st Air Defence Regiment of the Baltic Fleet. This regiment was situated in the southern forts.

During World War II, Kronstadt was subject to several bombing raids by the Luftwaffe. In August 1941 the Luftwaffe began bombing Kronstadt repeatedly. The most notable bombing was Stuka ace Hans-Ulrich Rudel's sinking of the battleship Marat.

To prevent an enemy landing, 13 artillery batteries were established in Kronstadt with nine more batteries outside the city, on the island of Kotlin. The main lookout was located in the Naval Cathedral. Visual range reached . The coastal defence forces of Kronstadt included two infantry regiments.

In late August, the Red Army in the Baltic States was in a critical situation. Tallinn, the main base of the fleet, was in danger and an order to relocate the fleet from Tallinn to Kronstadt was given. By the time the Soviets had decided on a maritime evacuation of Tallinn, over 200 Soviet civilian and military vessels had been assembled in Tallinn harbour.

After the evacuation of Tallinn, a submarine subdivision had been organized in Kronstadt. By the end of 1941, 82 naval operations had taken place. Hitler was enraged, because Soviet submarines frequently disrupted military supplies of strategic materials from Sweden to Germany. The Germans tried to block the exit completely from the Gulf of Finland with anti-submarine nets and mines. Despite these efforts, the Soviet submariners continued to attack German ships. In 1942, 29 German vessels were sunk. Submarines cooperated with reconnaissance aircraft in searching for military targets.

Soviet submarines had broken through the mine barrages in the Gulf of Finland in 1942. To keep the Soviet submarine force away from Baltic shipping stronger efforts were planned. The minefields would be larger and in addition a double submarine net would be laid from Porkkala to Naissaar in Operation Walross. The blockade of the Gulf of Finland turned out to be 100% effective. But in 1944, when Finland signed a peace treaty with the Soviet Union, one of the conditions was that the Soviets could locate one naval base in Finland at Porkkala. Submarine warfare in the Baltic Sea reached its final stage after peace was reached with Finland.

The Baltic Fleet sent more than 125,000 people to serve on shore at the front. Eighty-three thousand people fought directly on the Leningrad Front. For the protection of Leningrad 10 brigades of naval infantry, four regiments, and more than 40 separate battalions and companies were formed in Kronstadt.

The Luftwaffe and German artillery sent thousands of bombs and shells onto the naval dockyard and the Arsenal factory. The German air raids in September 1941, damaged ships of the Baltic Fleet and the infrastructure of the naval dockyard. Several sections of the yard were destroyed, the docks were heavily bombed causing the death of dozens of workers and engineers. Nevertheless, the naval yard continued its work. Despite the siege, the workers persevered with their work, often working 18–20 hours a day.

Thanks to the power of the Kronstadt Fortress the destruction of Leningrad, then the main industrial and cultural centre of the Soviet Union, was successfully prevented. The honorary status of "City of Military Glory" was conferred on it by the President of the Russian Federation Dmitriy Medvedev on April 27, 2009, citing the "courage, endurance and mass heroism, exhibited by defenders of the city in the struggle for the freedom and independence of the Motherland".

Population
With changing historical trends, the population saw peaks and troughs partly determined by the expansion and then decline of the naval base and dockyard.

Note Census data of 1897 includes military personnel

Recent population data indicate it has stabilised as follows:

Places of interest

The city of Kronstadt is built on level ground on the island and is thus exposed to flooding, most notably in 1824. The port is icebound for 140–160 days in the year, from the beginning of December to April. A very large proportion of the inhabitants are sailors. On the south side of the city there are three harbours: the large western or merchant harbour, the western flank of which is formed by a great pier joining the fortifications which traverse the breadth of the island on one side. The middle harbour was used chiefly for fitting out and repairing vessels. The eastern or military harbour was used for docking vessels of the Russian Navy. The Peter and Catherine Canals connected with the merchant and middle harbours across the city. Between them stood the old Italian Palace of Prince Menshikov, whose site was later occupied by a school for pilots. In the second half of the 18th century the building of the former Italian palace was used by various military training institutions. In 1771–1798 the Sea Cadet Corps was housed there before being transferred to St Petersburg. From 1798 to 1872 the Navigation School was situated in the former palace.

The Kronstadt tide gauge is situated near the former Italian palace. Sea level observations in Saint Petersburg began already in 1703. On Kotlin Island, the main naval fortress of the Russian Empire began observations in 1707. This monitoring was necessary because the water level of the Finnish Gulf could change considerably in a short time, creating problems for shipping. The annual flood also required close monitoring of the water level. The Kronstadt sea-gauge with the tide gauge pavilion is the zero level of the Baltic system of highs and lows. All depths and altitudes (even the heights of spacecraft) in Russia and some other countries of the former Russian Empire are measured according to the Kronstadt sea-gauge. Yuri Gagarin, the first man in space, said in 1967 that it was "the Hub of the Universe".

The modern city's most striking landmark is considered to be the enormous Naval Cathedral, dedicated to St Nicholas and built between 1908 and 1913 in Anchor Square which also contains many military memorials. The cathedral is regarded as the culmination of Russian Neo-Byzantine architecture.
The Pyotrovsky Gardens is a park that surrounds the monument to Peter the Great who founded the city.
There are a number of historic buildings, such as the Dutch Kitchen and the former Italian Palace, that recall the city's mercantile and military past.

Among other public buildings are the Naval Hospital, the British Seamen's Hospital (established in 1867), the Civic Hospital, the Admiralty (founded in 1785), the arsenal, dockyards and foundries, the School of Marine Engineering, and the English Church.

The Kronstadt port was once considered the most fortified port in the world. It still retains some of its old "forts" on small fortified artificial islands. Originally, there were 22 such forts, situated in line with the southern and northern shores of the Gulf of Finland. Some fortifications were located inside the city itself and one was on the western shore of Kronslot Island, on the other side of the main navigational channel.

The construction of the Saint Petersburg Dam led to some of the forts being demolished. The dam, a levee-causeway-Seagate combination also enabled Kronstadt and some of the forts being reached by land. Among the most important surviving forts are:

Fort Konstantin, the biggest in the Gulf of Finland
Fort Rif on the western shore of the island; and the particularly well-preserved Fort Alexander I, "the Plague Fort"
Fort Totleben, named after Eduard Totleben, the largest and the newest of the forts, built at the beginning of the 20th century.

There are daily bus and water tours to Kronstadt from Saint Petersburg.

Devotion to St. John of Kronstadt
The now demolished older St Andrew Cathedral (1817), once a prominent Kronstadt landmark, was destroyed on Communist orders in 1932. St John of Kronstadt, one of the most venerated Russian saints, served there as priest from 1855 to 1908.

Saint Petersburg Dam

The controversial dam that took 30 years to build (1980–2011) now links Kotlin island to the mainland from north and south, not only acts as part of the flood defences, but lets through shipping and completes the St Petersburg ring-road system, across the island. It is a feat of marine engineering consisting of a combination of levee-causeway and seagate. Its construction on the shoals of the Gulf of Finland involved the removal of some of the historic fortifications.

Twin towns – sister cities

Kronstadt is twinned with:

 Annapolis, United States
 Asipovichy, Belarus
 Changli County, China
 Dax, France
 Demre, Turkey
 Feodosia, Crimea
 Ii, Finland
 Kotka, Finland
 Lushan City, China
 Marostica, Italy
 Messina, Italy
 Mühlhausen, Germany
 Nafplio, Greece
 Narva-Jõesuu, Estonia

 Nordborg (Sønderborg), Denmark
 Oulu, Finland
 Oxelösund, Sweden
 Pinghu, China
 Põhja-Tallinn (Tallinn), Estonia
 Pudasjärvi, Finland
 Sumoto, Japan
 Toulon, France
 Zhongshan County, China

Former twin towns
 Piła, Poland

On 1 March 2022, the Polish city of Piła suspended its partnership with Kronsdadt as a reaction to the 2022 Russian invasion of Ukraine.

Notable people
Thomas Gordon (1658 -1741), admiral, Governor and Commander-in-Chief at Kronstadt from 1727 until his death in 1741. His granddaughter Anne Young married a Scot, Lt. Thomas MacKenzie (Foma Kalinovich Mekenzi, Фома Калинович Мекензи, son of Colin). Two years after their marriage in 1738 they had a son also called Thomas, (Foma Fomich Mekenzi (Фома Фомич Мекензи, son of Thomas), a Scottish-Russian rear admiral who founded the city of Sevastopol in the service of the Russian Empire in 1783.
Domenico Trezzini (1670–1734), Swiss-Italian architect who worked on first design of Kronstadt
William Tooke (1744–1820), chaplain (1772–75) to the English merchant community in Kronstadt, later moved to St. Petersburg
 (1744–1813), French naval officer, emigrant after the French Revolution, became a Rear admiral of the Imperial Navy and governor of Kronstadt (1799–1801)
Agustín de Betancourt (1758–1824), Spanish engineer and town-planner of Kronstadt
Thomas Tooke (1774–1858), British economist and statistician, was born in Kronstadt on February 26, 1774
Aleksey Greig (1775–1845), Admiral of the Imperial Russian Navy, son of Samuel Greig, a Scottish Admiral in the service of Russia
Otto Friedrich Theodor von Möller (1812–1874), painter of German descent
Alexei Ivanovich Butakov (1816–1869), Admiral and explorer, brother of Admiral Grigory Butakov
Mikhail Britnev (1822–1889), shipbuilder
Saint John of Kronstadt (1829–1909), Kronstadt parish priest and revered as a saint after his death
Nikolai Kulchitsky (1856–1925), histologist
Ivan Yendogurov (1861–1898), painter
Mikhail von Schulz (1862–1917), Vice-admiral of the Russian Imperial Navy
Eino Rahja (1885–1936), Finnish-Russian Communist revolutionary
Nikolay Gumilyov (1886–1921), influential poet and founder of Acmeist poetry, murdered by the Cheka
Jukka Rahja (1887–1920), Finnish-Russian Communist revolutionary, born in the city
Ivan Yevdokimov (1887–1941), writer
Stepan Petrichenko (1892–1947), leader of the Kronstadt Mutiny (1921)
Pyotr Sobennikov (1894–1960), Soviet lieutenant general
Pyotr Kapitsa (1894–1984), birthplace of co-recipient of the 1978 Nobel Prize in Physics.
Cleo Nordi (1898–1983), Russo-Finnish ballerina was born in Kronstadt. She later taught in London
Nikolay Dubinin (1907–1998), Geneticist
Boris Stark (1909–1996), missionary and priest
Alexander Gomelsky (1928–2005), basketball player and coach
Sergei Revyakin (born 1995), Russian football goalkeeper

Gallery

References

External links

Kronstadt history 
Kronstadt web site
Map of Kronstadt 
Kronstadt: Virtual Excursion in Russian
International Kronstadt Development Fund
Kronstadt Fortress (city fortifications)
Kronstadt sea forts: South part and North part

 
1703 establishments in Russia
Populated places established in 1703
History of Saint Petersburg
Petergofsky Uyezd
Populated coastal places in Russia
Port cities and towns in Russia
Russian and Soviet Navy bases
World Heritage Sites in Russia